The Hodges Figgis Trophy was presented to the winner of the All-Ireland Higher Education Senior Gaelic football Championship. The annual match was played between the Sigerson Cup champion and the Trench Cup Champion.

History

The Hodges Figgis Trophy was presented in 1976 to the Comhairle Ard Oideachais (CAO) Cumann Lúthchleas Gael, the Higher Education Council of the Gaelic Athletic Association, by Mr Allen Figgis of the Dublin-based book retailing chain Hodges Figgis. The trophy was a silver replica of an open book, measuring 14 inches by 8 inches, mounted on a wooden base. The trophy was competed for between the winners of the Sigerson Cup and the Trench Cup and marked the culmination of the CAO's programme of Gaelic football championships within Third-Level institutions. It was widely seen among students as a battle between the universities (Sigerson Cup) and the non-university third-level institutions (Trench Cup). The Trench Cup was inaugurated in the 1975–76 season to cater for the third-level colleges which did not compete in the Sigerson Cup championship, inaugurated in 1911. The inaugural Hodges Figgis Cup match took place at Croke Park, Dublin in April 1976 between St Patrick's College, Maynooth (now NUI Maynooth), who beat University College Dublin in the Sigerson Cup final, and the National College of Physical Education, Limerick, who beat Coláiste Phádraig, Drumcondra in the inaugural Trench Cup final. Both teams were star-studded with county GAA players. N.C.P.E. Limerick became the inaugural Hodges Figgis Trophy winners. In 1983 Northern Ireland Polytechnic (now University of Ulster Jordanstown) won their match against University College Galway to lift the Hodges Figgis Trophy. The valuable trophy was lost. With no trophy to play for, the Sigerson v Trench Cup winners series ceased. In 1978 the Hodges Figgis chain of bookshops, long owned by the Figgis family, was acquired for £210,000 by the U.K. bookselling company, Pentos.

Roll of honour

Team sheets

Winning captains

References

1976 establishments in Ireland
Defunct Gaelic football competitions
Gaelic football competitions at Irish universities